Cresera espiritosantensis is a moth of the family Erebidae. It was described by Rego Barros in 1958. It is found in southern Brazil.

References

Phaegopterina
Moths described in 1958